Biysk Airport  is an airport in Russia located 12 km southeast of Biysk.  It services very small transports.

References

External links

Airports built in the Soviet Union
Airports in Altai Krai